Olympus Rugby XV Madrid is a rugby union team that competes in the European Challenge Cup. The side was formed to play in the 2009–10 European Challenge Cup, consisting of footballers playing in the domestic Spanish leagues.  After an absence of three seasons, it intended to participate in the 2013–14 European Challenge Cup, but was forced to withdraw due to financial issues.

2009/10 European Challenge Cup

Olympus Rugby XV Madrid competed in the 2009–10 season of the European Challenge Cup. The side was formed of footballers playing in the domestic Spanish leagues.

They lost all six of their pool matches and finished 4th in the pool table.

2009/10 Pool table

2009/10 Matches

2009/10 Squad

2013/14 European Challenge Cup
After an absence of three seasons, the team intended to participate in the 2013–14 season of the European Challenge Cup.  In the draw carried out on 5 June 2013 at the Aviva Stadium in Dublin, Olympus Madrid was drawn in Pool 5 against France's Stade Français, England's London Irish and Italy's Cavalieri Prato.  However, due to financial issues, the team withdrew from the competition and was replaced by Lusitanos XV on 2 September 2013.

See also
 Spain national rugby union team
 Rugby union in Spain

References

External links
 Olympus Madrid on ercrugby.com
 Rugby Spain

Spanish rugby union teams
Sports teams in Madrid
Rugby clubs established in 2009
EPCR Challenge Cup
2009 establishments in Spain